Pseudonoduloconus is a subgenus of sea snails, marine gastropod mollusks in the genus Conus, family Conidae, the cone snails and their allies.

In the latest classification of the family Conidae by Puillandre N., Duda T.F., Meyer C., Olivera B.M. & Bouchet P. (2015), Pseudonoduloconus has become a subgenus of Conus as Conus (Pseudonoduloconus)Tucker & Tenorio, 2009 (type species: Conus carnalis G. B. Sowerby III, 1879) represented as Conus Linnaeus, 1758

Species
 Pseudonoduloconus carnalis (G. B. Sowerby III, 1879) represented as Conus carnalis G. B. Sowerby III, 1879 (alternate representation)

References

External links
 To World Register of Marine Species

Conidae
Gastropod subgenera